The Ford F-250 Super Chief is a concept truck built by Ford. It featured a tri-flex fueling system that allows users to use three different fuels including gasoline, E85 ethanol or hydrogen. This is intended to make the Super Chief more attractive to customers who are concerned about finding fuel as the ethanol and hydrogen infrastructures are developing. In a tri-flex fueling system owners can utilize any given option at any one time. It comes with a stock bed cover and liner; it is a crew cab. In addition, the rear doors have been converted to suicide doors.

The tri-flex fueling system on the Ford F-250 Super Chief allows operators to go 500 miles between total refueling with the supercharger activated only when using the hydrogen fueling system. The hydrogen system also provides 400 lb.-ft. of torque. The transfer between fueling options is performed through a switching system onboard and can be accomplished while the vehicle is running. The hydrogen-based fuel alternative boasts 12-percent greater fuel efficiency when compared to either of the remaining fueling options. Using hydrogen also provides 99-percent less  emissions than the gasoline-only option.

While the tri-flex system is a new concept at Ford, the automaker has been committed to providing customers with a flex-fueling system in their F-150 models for 2005 and 2006 that allows either unleaded or E85 to be used in the same tank. The tri-flex system is a bold proclamation by Ford that hydrogen may be the next readily available fuel supply for the world, and they are ready to roll with the roll out.

Design
In design, the Super Chief surpasses the designs of past F-Series trucks which include the Ford F-250 Super Duty Crew Cab, the Ford F-250 Super Duty King Ranch, and the 2002 Ford Mighty F-350 Tonka concept. Hence its nameplate, the front end and grille of the Super Chief was inspired by the Super Chief locomotives.

Powertrain 
Not much is known about the powertrain, other than the engine being a supercharged tri-flex 6.8L V10 producing 550 horsepower.

Appearances

Despite that it never went into production; the Super Chief was in a game for the Nintendo Wii and PlayStation 2 called Ford Racing: Off Road. Being the most powerful and expensive car in the game, which featured both Ford and Land Rover vehicles.

Another notable and the only other appearance: It also appeared as a body, on the opening of formerly Myrtle Beach, South Carolina-based Ridemakerz' toy car building shop. The body is still available, as it's still produced under license to Ridemakerz.

External links and references
Super Chief Info from ConceptCarz.com
Ford Super Chief

Specific

Super Chief
Pickup trucks
Ford F-Series